Lawrence Allen (25 April 1921 – 16 December 2018) was a British racewalker who competed in the 1952 Summer Olympics. He competed at club level for City of Sheffield AC. He died in December 2018 at the age of 97.

References

1921 births
2018 deaths
Athletes (track and field) at the 1952 Summer Olympics
British male racewalkers
English male racewalkers
Olympic athletes of Great Britain
Sportspeople from Sheffield